Wales Arts Review is a critical writing hub for Wales. Originally published fortnightly, the site has published daily since 2016. It offers a critique, by Welsh and Wales-based writers, of various social and cultural aspects of Wales.

History 

The Wales Arts Review was founded in 2012 by Editors Gary Raymond, Phil Morris, Dean Lewis and Dylan Moore as a successor to the literary magazine The Raconteur. Founded on the principal of providing a community of writers and artists a high quality critical coverage of the arts in Wales, its core function is to build a platform for a new generation of Welsh critics to engage with the wider world through writing about and vigorously debating books, theatre, film, music, the visual arts and the media.

In partnership with Wales Arts International, the Welsh Books Council and the Arts Council of Wales, Wales Arts Review has quickly established itself in a central role in the new Welsh culture of arts criticism.

Features 

Wales Arts Review has, along with comprehensive arts reviews and interviews published many feature articles and essay debates. These have included exclusive access to the National Theatre Wales’ first production in Japan, Alan Harris' The Opportunity of Efficiency, and Dirty Protest Theatre's production at The Royal Court Theatre, the first appearance by a Welsh theatre company in over a decade. Further ongoing feature articles include a series of essays entitled the 'eternal conversation' in which critics discuss the nature and need of criticism in Welsh arts culture. Plus Wales Arts Review continues to publish a series of internationally based Welsh authors, who investigate the impact of Welsh culture outside Wales. This reportage series also has included first hand accounts of the Gezi protests.

Furthermore, Wales Arts Review has established various creative writing collaborations including with the Rhys Davies Trust to promote short story telling in Wales.

Contributors 

Notable contributors have included:

 Horatio Clare
Gillian Clarke
Jonathan Edwards
Catherine Fisher
Richard Gwyn
Tristan Hughes
Shani Rhys James
Gwyneth Lewis
Hayley Long
 Adrian Masters
Patrick McGuinness
 Nuala Ni Chonchuir
 Helen Calcutt
 Owen Thomas
 Rachel Trezise
Sarah Waters
Charlotte Williams

Staff 

Editors
 April 2013–present: Gary Raymond
 January 2012 – April 2013: Gary Raymond & Dylan Moore

Managing Editors
 2016–present: Ben Glover
 November 2012 – 2016: Phil Morris

Senior Editors
 2019–present: Caragh Medlicott
 2019–present: Dr Emma Schofield
 2016–present: Craig Austin
 2016–present: Cerith Mathias

Assistant Editors
 2020–present: Bethan Hall
 2018-2019: Jafar Iqbal
 2017-2018: Durre Shahwar

Design Editor
 January 2012 – 2015: Dean Lewis

Editor-at-Large
 April 2013 – 2014: Dylan Moore

Deputy Editors
 April 2013 – 2016: Steph Power, John Lavin, Ben Glover

References

External links 
Official site

Literary magazines published in Wales